"Voices in the Earth" is the second segment of the thirty-fourth episode and the tenth episode of the second season (1986–87) of the television series The Twilight Zone. In this segment, a survey expedition returns to a lifeless Earth to find the ghosts of the last humans on the planet are still seeking a way to survive.

Plot
Donald Knowles is an archaeologist accompanying an expedition surveying Earth 1,000 years after all life has been destroyed by human exploitation of the environment. In those years humanity has only increased its consumption of natural resources, to the point where expeditions such as these are needed to constantly scout out uninhabited planets for mining. Knowles has four days to explore before mining ships come to strip Earth of resources. As Knowles explores an abandoned café he plays Chopin's Nocturne Op. 9 No. 2 on an old CD player, and is confronted by ghosts.

The ghosts are the forefathers left on Earth when life became unsustainable. They believe that humans are coming back to repopulate Earth. Knowles explains why they are really there. He tries to get them to leave Earth, but they cannot leave on conventional ships because they warp space in a way that makes it impossible for them to survive the trip. They plead with him not to let the others destroy what remains of Earth in their search for valuable minerals. Knowles takes Commander Jacinda Carlyle to the café to meet the ghosts. However, they refuse to appear. Later, the specters possess Knowles and force him to attack a console on the ship. Carlyle and the other crew members stop him. Carlyle, now convinced Knowles is having a breakdown as a result of the trauma of seeing the ruined Earth, gives him medical leave.

Knowles returns to the café to confront the ghosts. They admit they plan to leave Earth by channeling through him. He refuses. He suggests instead that if they were able to change the methane to oxygen to allow him to breathe without a spacesuit, they can change Earth into a living world again. They claim they may not be able to perform such a large-scale feat without losing consciousness. He calls them cowards for not trying and returns to the ship. Suddenly, the ship's readings show it is raining, restoring the biosphere. The first stages of life are discovered in the oceans. Evolution is accelerated, returning Earth to a living planet. As such, the mining expedition must be cancelled, since the law does not allow mining of inhabited planets. Knowles steps outside and—not knowing if they can hear him or not—calls out that one day they will be back.

External links
 

The Twilight Zone (1985 TV series season 2) episodes
1987 American television episodes

fr:Les Voix de la Terre